Carrollton is a city in and the county seat of Pickens County, Alabama, United States. At the 2010 census the population was 1,019, up from 987 in 2000.

The Pickens County Courthouse in the center of Carrollton was erected in 1877. The first courthouse in Carrollton was burned on April 5, 1865 by troops of Union General John T. Croxton. A second courthouse was destroyed by a fire on November 16, 1876.

History
Incorporated in 1831, the town was named after Charles Carroll of Carrollton, Maryland, the only Roman Catholic and longest-living signer of the Declaration of Independence. A post office has been in operation at Carrollton since 1831.

As was typical, the county jail was located at the courthouse. The courthouse square was used frequently as a site for public lynchings by whites of African Americans, part of numerous efforts to suppress them during a time of high tensions as whites struggled for dominance. It was part of a program of intimidation and racial terrorism, with these murders frequent in the decades on either side of the turn of the 20th century. Among the numerous African Americans lynched in Carrollton was John Gibson, hanged on August 28, 1907. Pickens County had the fifth highest total of lynchings in Alabama, according to Lynching in America (2015, 3rd edition), published by the Equal Justice Initiative.

Geography
Carrollton is located at  (33.260858, -88.094452).

Demographics

2020 census

As of the 2020 United States census, there were 1,023 people, 353 households, and 218 families residing in the town.

2010 census
As of the 2010 United States Census, there were 1,019 people living in the town. 49.0% were White, 43.1% African American, 0.1% Native American, 3.6% from some other race and 4.2% of two or more races. 10.4% were Hispanic or Latino of any race.

2000 census
As of the census of 2000, there were 987 people, 384 households, and 279 families living in the town. The racial makeup of the town was 53.39% White, 44.58% Black or African American, 0.10% Asian, and 1.93% from two or more races. 0.41% of the population were Hispanic or Latino of any race.

There were 384 households, out of which 35.2% had children under the age of 18 living with them, 40.1% were married couples living together, 28.9% had a female householder with no husband present, and 27.3% were non-families. 25.5% of all households were made up of individuals, and 14.8% had someone living alone who was 65 years of age or older. The average household size was 2.57 and the average family size was 3.07.

In the town, the population was spread out, with 29.4% under the age of 18, 10.5% from 18 to 24, 23.7% from 25 to 44, 20.5% from 45 to 64, and 15.9% who were 65 years of age or older. The median age was 34 years. For every 100 females, there were 77.8 males. For every 100 females age 18 and over, there were 65.2 males.

The median income for a household in the town was $24,318, and the median income for a family was $29,612. Males had a median income of $30,833 versus $18,333 for females. The per capita income for the town was $12,153. About 31.4% of families and 38.5% of the population were below the poverty line, including 56.9% of those under age 18 and 26.1% of those age 65 or over.

Education
The Pickens County Board of Education is located in Carrollton. Students in the area can attend Carrollton Elementary School for Grades K-6. Carrollton is also the home of the Pickens County Educational Center, a branch of Bevill State Community College.

Notable people
Hanley Funderburk, president of Auburn University from 1980 to 1983
Walter Jones, NFL All Pro football player and part of the NFL Hall of Fame
John H. Kelly, one of the youngest generals to die during the American Civil War at the age of 24
Homer H. Norton, head coach for Texas A&M from 1934 to 1947. Inducted into the College Football Hall of Fame  in 1971.
Courtney Taylor, former Auburn University and Seattle Seahawks wide receiver

Gallery
Below are photographs taken in Carrollton as part of the Historic American Buildings Survey conducted during the Great Depression to document the buildings across the US:

References

Towns in Pickens County, Alabama
Towns in Alabama
County seats in Alabama